The Blu celeste Tour is the debut tour by Italian singer, rapper and songwriter Blanco, in support of his 2022 studio album Blu celeste. Consisting of two legs and 27 shows, the tour began on 3 April 2022 in Padua and concluded on 17 September 2022 in Milan.

Development 
Following the success of his first studio album Blu celeste, Blanco announced the dates for the first leg of the Blu celeste Tour on 21 December 2021. It initially consisted of eight shows, but seven dates were added in Padua, Milan, Rome, Venaria Reale, Florence, Bologna and Brescia after tickets sold out in less than hour on the same day of the tour announcement. After Blanco and Mahmood's win at the Sanremo Music Festival 2022, twelve new shows were added as part of the second leg of the tour. Tickets sold out in a few hours, with the tour reaching a total of 300,000 tickets sold.

Set list
This set list is from the concert on 10 April 2022 in Rome. It is not intended to represent all shows from the tour.

 "Mezz'ora di sole"
 "Paraocchi"
 "Figli di puttana"
 "Sai cosa c'è"
 "Finché non mi seppelliscono"
 "Pornografia"
 "David"
 "Ladro di fiori"
 "Belladonna (Adieu)"
 "Notti in bianco (Acoustic)"
 "Blu celeste"
 "Lucciole"
 "Amatoriale"
 "Ruggine"
 "Follia"
 "Mi fai impazzire"
 "Afrodite"
 "La canzone nostra"
 "Brividi"
 "Notti in bianco"

Tour dates

References 

 Blanco (singer) concert tours